The Big Flat School Gymnasium is a historic school building in Big Flat, Arkansas.  It is a single-story stone masonry structure with a gable roof.  It is basically Plain-Traditional in its styling, except for its Craftsman-style entrance porches, both located on the south (main) facade.  The most significant alteration since its construction in 1938-41 is the replacement of the eastern stone wall with a frame structure clad in artificial siding.  The gymnasium was built by crews of the National Youth Administration, and is the only major public works building in the community.

The building was listed on the National Register of Historic Places in 1993.

See also
National Register of Historic Places listings in Baxter County, Arkansas

References

School buildings on the National Register of Historic Places in Arkansas
School buildings completed in 1938
National Register of Historic Places in Baxter County, Arkansas
National Youth Administration
American Craftsman architecture in Arkansas
1938 establishments in Arkansas
Bungalow architecture in Arkansas
Gyms in the United States